Jessica Nkosi (born 20 January 1990) is a South African actress and TV presenter, best known for her leading roles in M-Net commissioned telenovelas Isibaya, Ayeye, ,The Queen, and Lavish.

Early life 
Jessica Nkosi was born in Empangeni, KwaZulu-Natal to Jabu Nkosi and Nhlanhlayethu Ntuli. Nkosi moved to Eshowe, KwaZulu-Natal after the separation of her parents. While Nkosi was in Grade 11, her father died from Hodgkin’s Lymphoma.

Nkosi attended the University of KwaZulu-Natal. Although she began her studies pursuing a Bachelor's Degree in Law, she later switched to studies toward a Bachelor's Degree in Drama and Performing Arts from which she graduated in 2012.

Personal life 
On September 2018, Nkosi and her partner Uzalo actor, Ntokozo Dlamini welcomed their daughter, Namisa Dlamini.

Career

Acting 
In 2013, Jessica Nkosi debuted her acting career with the role of Qondisile on the South African telenovela Isibaya.

In 2015, she starred as Eve on Mzansi Magic's Ayeye.

In 2020, Jessica began her new role as main female villain Thando Sebata on the popular South African telenovela, The Queen.

MC and Presenting 
In 2017, Nkosi made her TV presenter debut as co-host on BET's A-List alongside her Isibaya co-star Nomzamo Mabtha.

Nkosi has made appearances on numerous award shows such as the Channel O Music Video Awards, the MTV Africa Music Awards, V-Entertainment and other shows. She has appeared on variety shows such as MTV's Lip Sync Battle Africa as a celebrity guest.

Nkosi first appeared on Our Perfect Wedding show as a guest presenter and later went on to host the show for the next season.

References

External links 
 

1990 births
Living people
South African actresses
South African television presenters
South African women television presenters